Popes Corners is an unincorporated community in Geauga County, in the U.S. state of Ohio.

Popes Corners was named for D. L. Pope, the original owner of the site.

References

Unincorporated communities in Geauga County, Ohio
Unincorporated communities in Ohio